"Taste in Men" is a 2000 single by the English alternative rock band Placebo. Taken from their third album, Black Market Music, it reached number 16 in the UK singles chart.

Music and reception
Gigwise ranked the track as Placebo's greatest hit, describing it as "bubbling, space-age blast of howling, claustrophobic electro-rock." Nevertheless, Pitchfork considered the song as a "lazy reprise the Roland 303 industrial funk of 'Pure Morning'."

According to frontman Brian Molko, the band was influenced by the industrial rock band Nine Inch Nails during the recording of the song, particularly by the track "Wish".

Music video
The music video, directed by Barbara McDonogh, was filmed in the Central London Register office. It shows Molko involved in a bizarre love triangle with a rowing couple.  Montages of Molko with both the man and the woman are sequenced throughout the video.

Live performance history
The song was a staple of the Black Market Music and Sleeping With Ghosts tours. Despite not appearing during the initial legs of the tour, it reappeared for the winter 2006 leg of the Meds tour and remained until the conclusion of the tour. It was the closing song for all shows on the Battle For The Sun tour. The song also appeared during the 2012 tour as the concluding song for all shows, but was dropped at the start of the Summer Festivals leg.

Trivia
The phrase "come back to me awhile" is taken from the Sonic Youth song "Catholic Block", found on their album Sister.

The song was used in an episode from the United States version of Queer as Folk.

The bass riff is almost identical to Roger Waters' "Let There Be More Light" from the Pink Floyd album A Saucerful of Secrets.

Track listings
CD1
Taste in Men (Radio edit) – 4:02
Theme from Funky Reverend – 2:54
Taste in Men (Alpinestars Kamikaze Skimix) – 4:36

CD2
Taste in Men (Album version) – 4:15
Johnny and Mary – 3:24
Taste in Men (Adrian Sherwood Go Go dub mix) – 4:19

Charts

References

2000 singles
Placebo (band) songs
2000 songs
Virgin Records singles
Electronic rock songs
Songs written by Steve Hewitt
Songs written by Brian Molko
Songs written by Stefan Olsdal